Friedrich August Georg Bitter (13 August 1873 – 30 July 1927) was a German botanist and lichenologist.

Born in Bremen, he studied at the Universities of Jena, Munich and Kiel, earning his doctorate at the latter institution in 1896. Afterwards he performed assignments in Berlin. In his studies he was influenced by instructors such as Simon Schwendener (1829–1919), Friedrich Wilhelm Zopf (1846–1909) and Johannes Reinke (1849–1931). In 1905 he was named director of the botanical garden in Bremen. During the later part of his career he served as director of the botanical garden in Göttingen.

He specialized in the botanical genus Solanum, as evidenced by his Solana Africana, a four-part monograph in which he provided descriptions of all known African Solanum species. In the field of lichenology, he conducted anatomical and developmental studies on the thallus of lichens. He performed significant research involving the lichen genus Parmelia (Hypogymnia).

Selected works 
 Zur Morphologie und Systematik von Parmelia, untergattung Hypogymnia, 1901 - Morphology and systematics of Parmelia, subgenus Hypogymnia (now regarded as a genus).
 Die Gattung Acaena, Vorstudien zu einer Monographie, 1911  - The genus Acaena.
 Solana Africana, 1913-1923 (in four parts). Parts I-III, issued in one volume with cover-title only, are reprints from Botanische jahrbücher, bd. 49, 54 and 57, 1913-21; pt. IV, with imprint: Dahlem bei Berlin, Verlag des Repertoriums, is extracted from Repertorium specierum novarum regni vegetabilis, Beihefte, of which it forms bd. 16.	
 Solanum morelliforme : eine baumbewohnende Verwandte der Kartoffel : nebst allgemeinen Bemerkungen über die Sektion Tuberarium, 1914.

See also
 :Category:Taxa named by Friedrich August Georg Bitter

References 
 SCHLECHTENDALIA 23  Lichenologists

1873 births
1927 deaths
Scientists from Bremen
Academic staff of the University of Bremen
Academic staff of the University of Göttingen
German lichenologists
20th-century German botanists